Montjoy is a herald, or royal messenger, of the French King in William Shakespeare's play Henry V. His job is to convey the King of France (King Charles VI )'s messages, including the constable's harsh message to King Henry. However, he conveys them in such a polite and respectable way that King Henry thinks on him favourably; an example of this can be seen when King Henry tips him when he has conveyed a message.

Role in the play 
Montjoy first appears in Act III, scene VI of the play to convey the King of France (King Charles VI)'s messages to King Henry V. The King of France thought that English troops would be defeated if the French rush to the battlefield because the English had a far weaker army than the French, so he let him ask the King of England what he is willing to pay us to get out of the war.

In the second act Montjoy appears in Act IV, Scene III in the English Camp. He delivered the messages of the Constable of France to King Henry. Montjoy changed the message of harsh language to polite language. France's constable requested an unconditional surrender from the English army, but Montjoy summoned to surrender in a polite way. Upon Henry's refusal, Montjoy replies "I shall, King Harry. And so fare thee well. Thou never shalt hear herald anymore." However, Henry predicted that he will come to Henry again for king of France's ransom.

In the final act, Montjoy briefly appears in Act IV, Scene VII in the another part of the field. He surrenders to Henry personally, saying that "I come to thee for charitable license. The day is yours.", and conveys news of the French defeat.

Adaptations
In Henry V (1989), directed by and starring Kenneth Branagh, Montjoy is portrayed by Christopher Ravenscroft. In this film, Montjoy additionally replaces both one of the French ambassadors who delivers the condescending gift of tennis balls on behalf of the Dauphin, Louis, Duke of Guyenne in Act I, Scene II, and Lord Grandpré in Act IV, Scene II.

Many community theatre productions also use Montjoy as the "tennis balls" ambassador.

References

External links
Speeches (Lines) for Montjoy in "Henry V", OpenSourceShakespeare

Male Shakespearean characters
Theatre characters introduced in 1599